Antrim railway station serves the town of Antrim in County Antrim, Northern Ireland.

The station currently serves trains on the Belfast to Derry line via Bleach Green and  station. Until 2003, Belfast-Derry trains reached here by means of the Lisburn-Antrim railway line, however, this line was mothballed after re-opening of the Bleach Green line. There is still the old platform for the Lisburn-Antrim line but has been cut back to allow room, on the other side of a fence, for the bus stands. The station has undergone a major refurbishment to become an integrated bus and rail hub. In total, the station had 4 platforms. One is completely disused, two in use, and one that has been shortened and rarely used.

History
Antrim station was opened by the Belfast and Ballymena Railway on 11 April 1848. It was originally operated by the Midland Railway Northern Counties Committee. They provided sidings on the up side of the station, serving the Showgrounds. These sidings also contained a goods store, stabling block, stationmaster's house, office, and weighbridge.

The station buildings at Antrim were rebuilt in 1901–02 to designs by the architect Berkeley Deane Wise. It was built in a red-brick, mock-Tudor design. The footbridge was built by Walter MacFarlane's Saracen Foundry in Glasgow.

The main station buildings were on the down platform, and the signal box was at the Belfast end of the same platform. There was a bay at the back of the down line platform for branch line trains, and also on this side of the mainline were the locomotive sheds, turntable, goods store, and sidings.

The station was run by the Ulster Transport Authority from 1948 to 1968, then part of Northern Ireland Railways. Since 1996 the station has been part of Translink.

The station itself used to also have a Station Masters House and Goods Yards.  The last known Station Master of Antrim Railway Station (Antrim Junction) was a Mr. Cupples.  At its peak, Antrim Railway Station was an important station linking many core routes now removed via its station.

The Station Masters House can still be seen (from outside). It has now been transformed into a health centre.

Service

In the other direction, there is an hourly service to Great Victoria street.

The 3rd platform for the Crumlin line is not signposted and hasn't been in passenger service since a diversion from the Bleach Green Line in 2014.

See also
 Antrim railway station (Great Northern Railway)

References

 
 

Railway stations in County Antrim
Antrim, County Antrim
Railway stations opened in 1848
Railway stations served by NI Railways
Grade B2 listed buildings
1848 establishments in Ireland
Rail junctions in Northern Ireland
Railway stations in Northern Ireland opened in 1848